Ron Yehuda Donagi (born March 9, 1956) is an American mathematician, working in algebraic geometry and string theory.

Career
Donagi received a Ph.D. in 1977 under the supervision of Phillip Griffiths from Harvard University (On the geometry of Grassmannians). Currently, he is a professor at the University of Pennsylvania.

From 1981 to 1982, from 1996 to 1997 and in 2013 he was at the Institute for Advanced Study, where he worked with Edward Witten. In the 1980s Donagi applied algebraic geometry to string theory and related theories such as supersymmetric Yang-Mills theories in order to develop models for heterotic string theory from suitable compactifications. Among his achievements in classical algebraic geometry are his work on the Schottky problem and generalizing the Torelli theorem.

He is a fellow of the American Mathematical Society.

Writings 
With Tony Pantev: Torus fibrations, Gerbes and duality, Memoirs AMS 2008
Editor with Mauro Francaviglia: Integrable systems and quantum groups (CIME Lectures, Montcatini Terme, June 1993), Springer Verlag 1996
Publisher: Curves, Jacobians, and Abelian varieties, Proceedings of an AMS-IMS-SIAM Joint Summer Research Conference on the Schottky problem, AMS 1992
With Katrin Wendland (Eds.): From Hodge theory to integrability and TQFT: tt *-geometry (Workshop University of Augsburg 2007), AMS 2008
With Witten: Supersymmetric Yang-Mills Systems and Integrable Systems, Nucl. Phys. B, 460, 1996, 299-344, Arxiv
With Josh Guffin, Sheldon Katz, Eric Sharpe, A mathematical theory of quantum sheaf cohomology, Preprint 2011
With Guffin, Katz, Sharpe: Physical aspects of quantum sheaf cohomology for deformation of tangent bundles of toric varieties, Preprint 2011
With Vincent Bouchard, on SU (5) Heterotic standard model, Phys. Lett. B, 633, 2006, 783-791

References

External links 
Homepage

1956 births
Living people
20th-century American mathematicians
21st-century American mathematicians
Harvard University alumni
University of Pennsylvania faculty
Mathematicians at the University of Pennsylvania
Fellows of the American Mathematical Society